This is a list of the works of James Connolly. James Connolly was an Irish socialist and rebel.

Pamphlets
Erin’s Hope – The End & The Means (1897)
The New Evangel – Preached to Irish Toilers (1901)
Labour in Irish History (1910)
Religion, Labour and Nationality (1910)
The Re-Conquest of Ireland (1915)

Songs
The Watchword of Labour (1916)
Be Moderate

Essays
Party Politicians – Noble, Ignoble and Local (1894)
Irish Socialist Republican Party (1896)
Socialism and Nationalism (1897)
Patriotism and Labour (1897)
Socialism and Irish Nationalism (1897)
Queen Victoria’s Diamond Jubilee (1897)
The Fighting Race (1898)
Home Rule Journalists and Patriotism (1898)
The Men We Honour (1898)
An Open Letter to Dublin Castle (1898)
Home Thrusts (1898)
The Roots of Modern War (1898)
Home Thrusts (1898)
Labour Representation (1898)
Peasant Proprietorship and Socialism (1898)
British and Russian Imperialism I (1898)
Home Thrusts (1898)
British and Russian Imperialism II (1898)
Home Thrusts (1898)
Regicide and Revolution (1898)
The Irish Land Question (1898)
The Independent and New Machinery (1898)
Parnellism and Labour (1898)
Home Thrusts (1898)
A Socialist Candidate for Dublin Corporation (1898)
Let Us Free Ireland! (1899)
Taken Root! (1902)
On Wages, Marriage and the Church (1904)
Wages and other things (1904)
Michael Davitt: A Text for a Revolutionary Lecture (1908)
Sinn Fein, Socialism and the Nation (1909)
A New Labour Policy (1910)

Sources
James Connolly - Marxist Internet Archive

Bibliographies of Irish writers